Blameless could refer to:

Blameless (band), a rock quartet formed in Sheffield, England, in 1993/94
Blameless (novel), a 2010 steampunk novel by Gail Carriger

See also
Blamelessness and Reconstruction